IF Sibbo-Vargarna (abbreviated SibboV) is a sports club from Sipoo, Finland specialising in football, cycling, athletics, volleyball, skiing, orienteering, dancing, and fitness. The club was formed in 1928 and its main home ground is at the Nikkilän keskusnurmi.  The men's football first team currently plays in the Kolmonen (Third Division).

Background

SibboV has spent many seasons in the lower divisions of the Finnish football league.  For much of the last decade the club has oscillated between the Nelonen (Fourth Division) and the Kolmonen (Third Division).  They have enjoyed a "yo-yo" existence with promotions from the Nelonen in 2001, 2005 and 2009 and immediate relegations from the Kolmonen in 2002 and 2006.  In the 2010 season SibboV are showing greater signs of stability as the club seek to maintain their position in the fourth tier.

Season to season

Club Structure
IF Sibbo-Vargarna run a large number of teams including 3 men's teams, 1 ladies team, 1 Futsal team, 3 veteran's teams (Oldtimers), 10 boys teams and 8 girls teams.

2010 season
SibboV Men's Team are competing in Section 2 (Lohko 2) of the Kolmonen administered by the Helsinki SPL and Uusimaa SPL.  This is the fourth highest tier in the Finnish football system.  In 2009 SibboV finished in 2nd place in Section 2 (Lohko 2) of the Nelonen and were promoted.

SibboV /2 are participating in Section 3 (Lohko 3) of the Vitonen administered by the Uusimaa SPL.

Current squad
as of 4 February 2015

Sources
Finnish Wikipedia
Suomen Cup

References

External links
Official website 

Football clubs in Finland
Sipoo
1928 establishments in Finland